Alice Albinia (born 1976) is an English journalist and author whose first book, Empires of the Indus, won several awards.

Albinia was born in London and read English Literature at Cambridge University and South Asian History at SOAS. In between, she worked for two years in Delhi as a journalist and editor. While in Delhi, she worked for the Centre for Science and Environment, the literary journal Biblio, and Outlook Traveller. Since 2012, she has taught writing at secondary schools with the support of the nonprofit First Story.

She was one of the three judges for the 2008 Jerwood Awards. Her debut novel, Leela's Book, is a modern story inspired by the Mahabharata.

Bibliography
Empires of the Indus: The Story of a River. John Murray, 2008. 
Leela's Book. Harvill Secker, 2011. 
Cwen. Serpent's Tail, 2021. 
The Britannias. Pending from Allen Lane, 2022.

Awards
2005 Royal Society of Literature Jerwood Awards for Non-Fiction for Empires of the Indus.
2009 Dolman Travel Prize
2009 Somerset Maugham Award.
K Blundell Turst award for The Britannias

References

1976 births
Living people
Writers from London
English women writers
British orientalists
Women orientalists